Lake Ojibway was a prehistoric lake in what is now northern Ontario and Quebec in Canada. Ojibway was the last of the great proglacial lakes of the last ice age. Comparable in size to Lake Agassiz (to which it was likely linked), and north of the Great Lakes, it was at its greatest extent c. 8,500 years BP. The former lakebed forms the modern Clay Belt, an area of fertile land.

Lake Ojibway was relatively short-lived. The lake drained in what must have been a catastrophic and dramatic manner around 8,200 years BP. A comparable mechanism produced the Missoula floods that created the channeled scablands of the Columbia River basin.

A recent analysis states it has not been conclusively determined whether the lake drained by a breach of the ice dam, by water spilling over the glacier, or by a flood under the glacier. It is also not conclusively known whether there were one or more pulses, and the route the water took to reach Hudson's Bay has not been determined.

The draining of Lake Ojibway is a possible cause of the 8.2-kiloyear event, a major global cooling that occurred 8,200 years BP.

See also
 Tyrrell Sea
 Glacial lake outburst flood
 Lake Agassiz
 Lake Missoula
 Champlain Sea
 Lake Algonquin 
 Lake Chicago
 Lake Maumee
 Last Glacial Maximum
 Midcontinent Rift System
 Niagara Escarpment
 Nipissing Great Lakes
 List of prehistoric lakes

References

External links

Glacial lakes of the United States
Glacial lakes of Canada
Geology of Ontario
Former lakes of North America
Proglacial lakes
Megafloods